Condorcaga (possibly from Quechua kuntur condor, qaqa rock) is an archaeological zone in the region of Cajamarca, in Peru. It is situated in the Chota Province, Lajas District. Condorcaga is also a natural viewpoint. In the upper part of the mountain there are rock formations.

References 

Mountains of Cajamarca Region
Archaeological sites in Peru
Archaeological sites in Cajamarca Region